Mystery Diners was an American reality television series on the Food Network. The series, hosted by Charles Stiles, debuted on May 25, 2012. Stiles is the owner of California-based Business Evaluation Services and Mystery Shopper Services.

Controversy around authenticity
A disclaimer at the end of the credits reads, "The people and events depicted in this program are real. Certain events may have been re-enacted for dramatic purposes."

Television reviewer Ben Pobjie wrote, "Mystery Diners has achieved enormous success on SBS Food Network despite making no attempt whatsoever to appear convincing. This show, which purports to 'expose' employees of restaurants ripping off their employers, contains so many implausible scenarios, inept actors and transparently fake denouements that it's really quite refreshing."

In Season 9 Episode 11, Stiles claimed that the crew had a brand new technology called "stingray", that could intercept text messages from a person's phone and the technology was supposedly used in the episode. Using such technology to intercept someone's text messages without their permission would be considered a violation of a number of privacy laws and regulations and it is unlikely the show would've done such a thing risking legal action. In the same episode, private investigator "Eliot", was depicted doing a stakeout of the property and catching one of the employees on camera cleaning up from a party. "Eliot" was shown holding a video camera that clearly would have been noticed by the employee and was not hidden or disguised in any way.

Another incident, that brought into the question the authenticity of the show, was on the episode, "Vicious Valets", where an alleged scam was supposedly caught taking place by two valet employees at a restaurant in Brooklyn, New York. The episode showed a valet employee parking a car in a prohibited spot and the car later being towed away by a private tow company. On New York City public streets, the NYPD, not a private company, is responsible for towing illegally parked cars.

Plot
The show focuses on the Mystery Diners, an organization that goes undercover at specific restaurants at their owners' requests, and sets up undercover stings and unseen surveillance cameras to catch misbehaving restaurant employees in the act.

Beginning in Season 9, Mystery Diners made changes to its format including the addition of private investigators, new technology, new graphics and opening credits, and advanced equipment. In the opening sequence, Stiles narrates that the changes were made on the pretext that restaurant staff have grown more aware of the show and the company and become more savvy in their scams.

The Consultation
Charles greets the owners with his signature, "Charles Stiles, Mystery Diners" at the episode's beginning. He and one or more of his fellow Mystery Diners meet with a restaurant's owner(s) to discuss the restaurant's problem(s) before opening, or at a neutral venue, and Charles learns of the possible suspect(s). Charles then tells the owner(s) that his team will come after hours to wire the restaurant with hidden cameras and microphones.

The narrator gives details of where the hidden cameras and microphones have been set up (usually with a floorplan graphic presenting a simplified layout of the establishment), and also mentions which Mystery Diners will be going undercover as new staff members or customers. Microphones and cameras are set up only in areas of the restaurant where legally allowed and customers and employees have no expectation of privacy (with restrooms and locker rooms universally excluded from stings), and sometimes are set up outside in patio and 'breakroom' areas of the establishments, whether outside or inside.

The Sting
Charles and the owner(s) operate from a control room setup, usually within an isolated part of the building without easy employee access, or in another nearby building rented temporarily during the sting length. Sometimes, a luton van or similar is hired. A number of large-screen LCD televisions featuring the live camera footage and graphics involving the sting subjects are configured in a multi-screen matrix and a switching system is utilized, along with audio monitoring of the establishment through shotgun microphones. The Mystery Diner decoy employees and customers are wired with hidden duplex two-way communication to Stiles and the control room, either through audible means and/or cameras hidden in common objects such as eyeglasses or other personal effects.

 Usually the owner introduces one undercover team member (who may have already spent some days at the establishment in advance of the sting) to the staff as a trainee waiter. The owner then retires to the control room to watch events unfold. Although the owner(s) are usually the contact, this individual can be acting on their behalf. On several occasions, a subordinate employee or co-partner has contacted Stiles for a sting against an owner accused of neglectful supervision, operation of the restaurant, or theft.
 Several episodes also have Stiles conduct a sting on behalf of owners appraising someone they want to sell their establishment to for their trustworthiness; in all cases, the buyers were proven to have ill intention.
 Others on the team appear as regular diners, charting the progress of service and quality of the food, and generally observing the staff to help reveal what goes on during the restaurant's regular operations.

From Season 9, Charles has also brought in one of his private investigators who shows the owner information he has found while doing background checks on the employees and details that are connected to any illegal activities.

The Confrontation
After seeing enough, the owner goes down and rounds up the staff members responsible for the problems and brings them to the control room to be confronted by Charles Stiles, an event which usually ends with said staff members getting fired and/or occasional law enforcement intervention if a confrontation becomes violent (though several have sighted the sting and quickly flee the building before the confrontation can take place). Otherwise, innocent staff members who prove to have been manipulated by the troublesome staff member are normally spared by the owners. There are also cases in which the staff member is merely reprimanded or quits without allowing the owner to render action against him/her.

Four Months Later or Restaurant Update
During the closing credits, the narrator tells the viewers what has happened, since the recording, to former and remaining employees and anyone else who was involved and reports on the restaurant's current status.

A graphic at the end of each episode states "Certain events may have been re-enacted for dramatic purposes."

The "Four Months Later" update element was dropped as time went on and the segment took on the generic "Restaurant Update" heading, as the program was able to economize their editing process to turn-around an episode in much less time than the earlier seasons.

Episodes

Green text means the target was innocent.

Blue text means the target was guilty of a different crime or tricked into being part of the main one.

Red text means the target was guilty of the main crime.

Season 1 (2012)

Season 2 (2012–13)

Season 3 (2013)

Season 4 (2013)

Season 5 (2014)

Season 6 (2014)

Season 7 (2014)

Season 8 (2014–15)

Season 9 (2015)

Season 10 (2015)

Season 11 (2015–2016)

References

External links

 
 Mystery Diners on TV.com
 Business Evaluation Services

2010s American reality television series
2012 American television series debuts
English-language television shows
Food Network original programming
2016 American television series endings